Zhanna Vasil'yevna Pliyeva (10 February 1949 – 22 January 2023) was a Soviet and Russian composer and pianist.

Life
Zhanna Pliyeva was born in Tskhinvali, Southern Ossetia. She studied music at the Rimsky-Korsakov State Conservatory, Leningrad, with Dmitry Svetozarov for piano and with Orest Yevlakhov and Alexander Mnatsakanian for composition. In 1979 she worked as an assistant to Sergey Slonimsky, and later as an orchestra musician, researcher, and teacher, and from 1979 to 1985 as director of the Tskhinvali School of Music. After 1990 she became a full-time composer.

Honors and awards
Prize-winner in the All-Union Composers 'Competition in 1977
Prize-winner in the Tokyo International Composers' Competition, 1993
Honoured Artist of Republic of Northern Ossetia-Alania, 1993
President of the Presidium of the Georgian Music Society, 1989-90

Works
Pliyeva's works are often based on the folklore of the Mountain People of the northern Caucasus. She has composed for stage, orchestra, and choral, instrumental and vocal solo performance. Selected works include:

Children of the Sun (children's opera, 2, Georgy Dzugayev), 1981
Fatima (ballet), 1982-84
The Passion of Adam (passion play, 2), 1993
Symphony no.1, S, perc, str
Symphony no.2, 1976
Symphony no.3, 1978
Symphony no.4, 1990–91
Symphony no.5, 1994
Music for Strings, 1996
About My Homeland (Georgy Dzugayev), chorus, pf, 1979
Comic Song, 1979
A Nightingale Sings, female vv, 1979
Sospeso (understated), female vv, 2 prep pfs
Chenena (trans.), genre scene, 1987
I'm Listening... It's Gone Quiet... (trad.), 4 choruses for Children, 1987
Prelyudii for piano 1970-72
Poem, Tokkata, for piano 5 sarcastic, 4 fugues, 1963–75
Minatyurï, for children, 1978,
Ritual, 1978
Triads for piano, 1978
Tokkatina, for piano, 1979
A Trip to the Zoo, for Children, piano, 1980
Sonatas for piano: 1982, 1984, 1990, 1995
From Ossetian Epos  (trad.), song cycle, S, T, pf, 1977
Caesar's Monologue (Georgy Bestouty), 1988
Autumn Reveries   (Leo Kotsta), S, pf, 1989

References

External links
 
 

1949 births
2023 deaths
20th-century classical composers
Russian music educators
Russian women classical composers
Russian classical composers
Ossetian people
Women music educators
20th-century women composers
State Prize of the Russian Federation laureates
South Ossetian people
People from Tskhinvali
Soviet women classical composers